Dioscoreophyllum volkensii, the serendipity berry, is a tropical dioecious rainforest vine in the family Menispermaceae. It is native throughout most of tropical Africa from Sierra Leone east to Eritrea, and south to Angola and Mozambique. It grows at low altitudes, from sea level up to 400 m. Some authors separate plants from above 200 m as a separate species D. cumminsii (Stapf) Diels.

There are two varieties:
Dioscoreophyllum volkensii var. volkensii. Endemic to the island of Bioko in Equatorial Guinea.
Dioscoreophyllum volkensii var. fernandense (Hutch. & Dalziel) Troupin. Mainland Africa.

Uses
The fruit contains monellin, an intensely sweet protein with potential use as a sugar replacement. For humans, monellin is 100,000 times sweeter than sucrose on a molar basis and around 3,000 times on a weight basis.

References

Menispermaceae
Flora of Africa
Dioecious plants